Donovan Alan Osborne (born June 21, 1969) is a former Major League Baseball player who pitched in the Major Leagues from -.

Career
Osborne attended Carson High School in Carson City, Nevada before he was drafted by the Montreal Expos in the 1987 Major League Baseball Draft.
After declining to sign with the Expos, Osborne attended the University of Nevada, Las Vegas (UNLV), where he played for the UNLV Rebels baseball team. Out of UNLV, Osborne was chosen by the St. Louis Cardinals in the first round (13th overall) of the 1990 amateur draft.

In the 1992 season, his Major League debut season, Osborne finished fifth in MLB Rookie of the Year Award voting.

In 1996, Osborne won 13 games for the Cardinals, made 30 starts for the only time in his career, pitched  innings, and posted a 3.53 earned run average. He ranked among the National League top-10 in walks per nine innings, shutouts, ERA+, and strike-to-walk ratio.

External links

1969 births
Living people
Albuquerque Isotopes players
Arkansas Travelers players
Bridgeport Bluefish players
Chicago Cubs players
Hamilton Redbirds players
Long Island Ducks players
Louisville Redbirds players
Major League Baseball pitchers
Baseball players from California
Memphis Redbirds players
New York Yankees players
Omaha Royals players
Sportspeople from Roseville, California
Portland Beavers players
St. Louis Cardinals players
St. Petersburg Cardinals players
UNLV Rebels baseball players